Human Factors is a German-Italian-Danish co-production drama film directed and written by Ronny Trocker. The film stars Mark Waschke, Hassan Akkouch, Marthe Schneider and Spencer Bogaert.

The film had its world premiere at the 2021 Sundance Film Festival on 29 January 2021.

Synopsis

Cast
 Mark Waschke as Jan
 Hassan Akkouch as Hendrik
 Marthe Schneider as Amélie
 Spencer Bogaert as Lucas

Production
The film began principal photography on 2 November 2019 and concluded on 12 December 2019. It was shot in Hamburg, Bruges, Koksijde, Blankenberge, De Panne and Veurne.

Release
The film had its world premiere at the 2021 Sundance Film Festival on 29 January 2021.

Reception

References

External links
 
 

2020s German-language films
2020s French-language films
2020s Dutch-language films
German drama films
Italian drama films
Danish drama films
German independent films
Italian independent films
Danish independent films
2021 drama films
2021 independent films
2021 LGBT-related films
German LGBT-related films
Danish LGBT-related films
Italian LGBT-related films
LGBT-related drama films
2021 multilingual films
German multilingual films
Italian multilingual films
Danish multilingual films